Zaisenhausen is a municipality in the district of Karlsruhe in Baden-Württemberg in Germany.

Notable people
 Erwin Eckert, clergyman and politician

References

Karlsruhe (district)